Dahushan railway station is a railway station in the town of Dahushan, Heishan County, Jinzhou, Liaoning, China. It is on the Beijing–Harbin railway and Dahushan–Zhengjiatun railway.

References 

Railway stations in Liaoning
Stations on the Beijing–Harbin Railway
Stations on the Dahushan–Zhengjiatun Railway